Triuncina is a genus of moths of the family Bombycidae. The genus was erected by Wolfgang Dierl in 1978.

Selected species
Triuncina brunnea (Wileman, 1911)
Triuncina cervina (Walker, 1865)
Triuncina diaphragma (Mell, 1958)
Triuncina religiosae (Helfer, 1837)

References

Bombycidae